Tarzan Escapes is a 1936 Tarzan film based on the character created by Edgar Rice Burroughs. It was the third in the Metro-Goldwyn-Mayer Tarzan series to feature Johnny Weissmuller as the "King of the Apes". Previous films were Tarzan the Ape Man (1932) and Tarzan and His Mate (1934), with Jane's bikini-like attire and the famous skinny-dipping sequence. Weissmuller and O'Sullivan starred together in three more Tarzan films, Tarzan Finds a Son! (1939), Tarzan's Secret Treasure (1941) and Tarzan's New York Adventure (1942).

Plot

Jane's (Maureen O'Sullivan) two cousins, Eric and Rita, arrive in Africa to tell Jane about a fortune left to her back in their world and to try to convince her to return with them. They are led to Tarzan's escarpment home by Captain Fry (John Buckler), a hunter with an agenda of his own. Jane convinces Tarzan to let her go back with Eric (William Henry) and Rita (Benita Hume), promising that their separation will only be temporary. But Captain Fry (unknown to the others) attempts to capture Tarzan to take him back to civilization so he can be put on public display, and actually succeeds in caging Tarzan. Fry's treachery includes making a deal with an unfriendly native tribe to give him food, canoes and protection for the journey back in exchange for his handing over Jane, Eric and Rita for "ju-ju" and taking away the greatest "ju-ju" – Tarzan.

Fry's plan goes wrong when the natives capture Tarzan in his cage and all four white people are taken prisoner. Tarzan manages to escape with the help of elephants and Cheeta, and guides what's left of Fry's party through a cave passage filled with treacherous quicksands. Just before they exit the caves to safety, Tarzan forces Fry to go back the way they came as punishment for his betrayal. Fry starts to go back, then seizes a heavy branch to attack Tarzan, but before he can exit the cave he falls into a quicksand bog (filled with "poisonous" lizards) and is swallowed up.  Rita and Eric tell Jane that it is not necessary for her to return with them and that she belongs with Tarzan. The film ends with Tarzan and Jane reunited at their tree house.

Cast
 Johnny Weissmuller as Tarzan
 Maureen O'Sullivan as Jane
 John Buckler as Captain John Fry
 Benita Hume as Rita
 William Henry as Eric
 Herbert Mundin as Rawlins
 E. E. Clive as Masters
 Darby Jones as Bomba
 Everett Brown as Hostile Native Chief 
 Johnny Eck as Gooney-Bird
 Monte Montague as Riverboat Captain

Production
The previous Tarzan film, Tarzan and His Mate had a number of directors. Maureen O’Sullivan has said James C. McKay actually directed the film. His official credit on that picture was Animal Director. McKay (1894–1971) had a resume full of various credits, and he jumped back and forth between the jobs of director and editor. McKay had received a Production Assistant credit on Trader Horn (1931) directed by W. S. Van Dyke. McKay was initially given the directors chair for the sequel, Tarzan Escapes (1936), indicating M.G.M must have been happy with the work he did on Tarzan & His Mate; however there would be many changes to cast and crew on that film too (including Elmer Sheeley replacing Cedric Gibbons as art director!). John Farrow was handed the director's chair. Reportedly he then practically re-shot the whole film. Regardless, Richard Thorpe ended up getting final director's credit. John Farrow (who had a fling with Dolores del Río) married Maureen O'Sullivan before the year was through.

Deleted scene
A scene, which took a week to shoot, featuring Tarzan fighting vampire bats was cut from the final film after test audiences found the scenes too intense. The first director James C. McKay shot many of the "gruesome" scenes, but he was replaced by John Farrow in 1936 who re-shot much of the film. Richard Thorpe would finally get credit for directing the film.

Critical reception

References

External links 

 
 
 
 
 ERBzine Silver Screen: Tarzan Escapes

1936 films
1930s fantasy adventure films
1930s English-language films
American black-and-white films
American fantasy adventure films
American sequel films
Films directed by John Farrow
Films directed by George B. Seitz
Films directed by Richard Thorpe
Metro-Goldwyn-Mayer films
Tarzan films
Films with screenplays by Cyril Hume
1930s American films